San Roque station  (called in the railway system San Roque-La Línea, due to the proximity of La Línea de la Concepción) is located in a neighbourhood belonging to the municipality of San Roque in the Cadiz province. The population of the neighbourhood is 2,582 inhabitants and it is situated between the river and the Guadarranque mountain. This neighbourhood is bordered by Taraguilla.

The neighbourhood was founded in 1909, the date on which they built the railway station and surrounding neighbourhoods were established mainly from the nearby Ronda mountains leading to the neighbourhood.

Adif Station 
The importance of this neighborhood is that it is located ADIF railway station in the municipality of San Roque, which also provides service to La Linea de la Concepcion and Gibraltar, about 125,000 people in total. This station was opened in 1909 on the Algeciras-Bobadilla railway line and is an early stop on the Algeciras-Granada Renfe service with three trains a day.

This station is being redesigned to allow greater accessibility to the disabled.

Communications 
In addition to the railway station, the San Roque station can be accessed by the A-405, which connects to Gaucin, and exit 115 of the A-7. There are two roads, the CA-9203 and CA-9207, leading to the Pinar del Rey and Los Barrios, respectively.

The San Roque station is included in the fare system of the Metropolitan Transport Consortium of Campo de Gibraltar. It belongs to the AB zone (Central Bay Arc).

Services

Freight 
A few miles north is the freight station of San Roque, one of the 19 stations of this kind in Spain, Adif maintained and operated by Renfe. The logistics terminal is the second busiest in Andalusia, Seville, just behind-the Bold.
It is accessible from the A-405.

References 

Railway stations in Andalusia
Buildings and structures in San Roque, Cádiz
Railway stations in Spain opened in 1909